The Mall, The Merrier is a 2019 Filipino musical fantasy comedy film directed by Barry Gonzales and starring Vice Ganda and Anne Curtis. The film was co-produced by Star Cinema and Viva Films under the working title Momalland.

The film premiered in Philippine cinemas on December 25, 2019, as one of the official entries to the 2019 Metro Manila Film Festival.

The Mall, The Merrier marks the first on-screen collaboration between Anne Curtis and Vice Ganda, both of whom are regular hosts in the noontime variety show It's Showtime.

Synopsis
Two siblings, Moira and Morissette, feud over Tamol Mall, a mall they inherited. The feud is compounded with the arrival of their Aunt Moody, and mysterious events begin to occur when a book containing secrets of the mannequins, toys and mascots that come alive after dark is unsealed.

Plot
The story revolves around Tanacio and Mola Molina. The couple owned Tamol Mall and were blessed with two children, Moises/Moira and Morisette. However, Tanacio and Mola separated. Morisette joined with her mother while Moira stayed with his father. Years later, Moira now manages the mall while Morisette works as editor-in-chief of a fashion magazine in Australia, with Mola. Tanacio and Mola are about to fly to Dubai, but both siblings told them not to go. Moira was shocked on the news that both of his parents died in a plane crash. Morisette comes home and starts a feud with her brother. During the reading of Tanacio's last will and testament, the lawyer had left the last page in his home in Zamboanga. Morissette makes a hostile takeover of the mall, but Moira affirms his right as the rightful owner by being the eldest son. Soon, both siblings fight a selling match, where whoever makes the most sales owns the mall. Moira and Morisette fight head-to-head to get most sales. In the end, they both tied. The lawyer comes and reads the final portion of the last will and testament, which reveals that Tanacio gave and bequeathed the mall to his only legitimate child, who is Morisette. Moira, hovever, insists that they are two. The lawyer further says that Mola was already pregnant to Moira when Tanacio married her. With no other choice, Moira accepts his defeat and decides to leave, but Morisette receives a call from her magazine, asking her to return to Australia.

Moira sees a vault behind his parents' wedding photo. Upon opening the vault, he sees a book of spell known as "Siquijoraciones", which contains a spell that can make pictures and statues come to life. He reads the spell aloud without noticing the microphone connected to a public announcement system being activated. This causes some of the malls mannequins, toys and pictures to come to life. When Moira and Morisette see it, they team up to stop this. In order for the pictures, statues and mannequins to return to normal, they must read the spell, but the book is taken by a golden cat that came to life. They get stopped by Moody, who works as a mall janitor, but is the older sister of Mola. She had been searching for the Siquijoraciones for a long time. Both Moira and Morisette eventually escape the wrath of Moody. Later, they see their old hut. When the mall was constructed, their old hut was never demolished. There, they see their parents Tanacio and Mola from their wedding photo, which was brought to life. Tanacio asks Moira for forgiveness and thanks him for never leaving his side despite his coldness towards him. Later Moody comes and shares a hug with them. However, at this moment, she takes Siquijoraciones. Moira, Morisette, Tanacio and Mola fight against them. Just as Moira is about to retake the book, the pages fly around, causing the three to look for the page with the spell. When Morissette finds the spell, she reads it aloud and the statues, pictures and mannequins return to their original form. Moody is also taken by mall security. Before vanishing, Mola tells Moira and Morisette to love one another. Morissette also vanished completely and when he goes back to the office, he finds out that Morisette's standee was with him the whole time. He sees the real Morisette tied up. She asks for forgiveness from him, and reveals that she saw everything. Morissette was about to leave for Australia after she saw how those in the mall loved Moira. She returned to the mall because she forgot her passport. She also found out about the Siquijoraciones, but she was tied up by the standee of her who came to life. In the end, both siblings renovate and manage the mall.

Cast

Main cast
 Anne Curtis as Morissette "Setset" Molina
Andrea Brillantes as teen Morissette
Heart Ramos as young Morissette
 Vice Ganda as Moira / Moises Molina
Mimiyuuuh as teen Moira/Moises Molina
Josh De Guzman as young Moira / Moises Molina

Supporting cast
 Dimples Romana as Tita Moody
 Elisse Joson as Mola Molina
 Jameson Blake as Tanacio Molina
 Lassy Marquez as Baks
 MC Calaquian as Tong
 Brenda Mage as Sasha
 Petite as Casim
 Jin Macapagal as Ewan
 Tony Labrusca as Gardo
 Negi
 Susan Africa as Aling Mae
 Chad Kinis as Lovely
 Matmat Centino

Guest cast
 Juliana Parizcovia Segovia
 Zeus Collins as Lapu-Lapu
 Maja Salvador as Sisa
 Charo Santos-Concio as herself
 Enrique Gil as Robohero
 Ruffa Gutierrez as Annabelle / herself
 Annabelle Rama as herself
 Mark McMahon as Ferdinand Magellan
 McCoy de Leon as Andres Bonifacio
 Donny Pangilinan as Jose Rizal
 Jackie Gonzaga as one of the Post Bastardas
 Yassi Pressman as Maria Clara
 Ion Perez as Richard 
 Kirst Viray as one of the Post Bastardos
 Greg Hawkins
 Carlo Mendoza as Totoy
 Miel Espinoza as Tetay
 Marigona Dona Dragusha
 Regine Velasquez as herself / singer
 Ogie Diaz as Nicole
 Francine Diaz
 Kyle Echarri
 Seth Fedelin

Production
The development for The Mall, The Merrier was first confirmed in April 2019, when lead actor Vice Ganda announced that he would star together with Anne Curtis in a then-yet-to-be-named comedy film which is intended to be entered for the 2019 Metro Manila Film Festival. The film was shot in Harrison Plaza in Malate, Manila, before it ceased operations on December 31, 2019. The finale scenes were filmed at Marquee Mall in Angeles City.

Release
The Mall, The Merrier premiered in the Philippines on December 25, 2019 as one of the official entries of the 2019 Metro Manila Film Festival.

Critical reception
The film received mixed reviews from critics, despite coming in first at the box office. Most of the criticism was directed at its "non-existent" plot, stale humor and poor use of the shopping mall setting.

Oggs Cruz of Rappler lamented what he saw as a wasted opportunity, stating it is "more of the same – and messier" and "while the settings change or the genre it spoofs shift, the elements remain the same. The comedies are all anchored on mean-spirited hilarity, all utilizing a broad moral lesson to make its abject crassness palatable to the families it caters to," comparing it unfavorably to George Romero's seminal zombie film Dawn of the Dead whose department store setting was used to satirize consumerism.

Conversely, Jocelyn Valle of PEP.ph gave the film a more positive review, praising the cast, special effects and pop culture references, particularly the feud between the Baretto sisters and the network rivalry between ABS-CBN and GMA Network, a scene where Vice's character Moises and a parodic depiction of the living doll Annabelle from The Conjuring, played by Ruffa Gutierrez, get into a hair-pulling fight and wind up in the premises of the GMA-7 broadcast facility. Valle did, however, criticise the "lack of a strong supporting character for Vice to throw punchlines at and comedic flair" and found Vice's use of a joke pertaining to German dictator Adolf Hitler to be of poor taste in light of Holocaust victims.

Television release

Pay-per-view
The film premiered on KBO from May 1–6, 2020 at the time ABS-CBN Channel 2 and its broadcast stations went off air on May 5, 2020, due to the "cease and desist order" given by the National Telecommunications Commission due to expired franchise, and KBO was not affected in this "cease and desist order" (due to the channel is on a digital station that is owned by AMCARA, which has its own franchise and where ABS-CBN had a blocktime agreement with the said station) until June 30, 2020 in Metro Manila and July 1, 2020 nationwide.

Cable television
The film premiered on Cinema One on August 2, 2020, PBO on October 10, 2020 and on Kapamilya Channel on November 2, 2020.

Free-to-air
The film premiered on A2Z Channel 11 on December 25, 2020, a year after its theatrical release. There were plans to be put on GMA 7 (as part of GMA  planned to put Star Cinema produced films), but the date isn't announced yet.

References

External links

2019 films
2019 comedy horror films
Philippine comedy horror films
2010s parody films
Cultural depictions of Ferdinand Magellan
Cultural depictions of Filipino men
Films about dolls
Films about toys
Films set in department stores
Philippine parody films
Philippine ghost films
Films about sentient toys
Supernatural comedy films
Philippine urban fantasy films